Lieutenant Colonel Alex Bath "Bandy" MacDonald (13 April 1898 – 12 May 1981) was an Australian Army officer.

Family and education
MacDonald was born in Walcha, New South Wales, son of Emily (née Bath) and Alexander Mark MacDonald. He was educated at Newington College from 1913 until 1916.

Military service
MacDonald served during the Second World War and commanded the Jungle Training Centre and Darwin Mobile Force. At war's end he became Director of the Australian Cadet Corps and then was senior Australian military observer with the United Nations Commission for Indonesia. He was discharged from the army on April 13, 1950. His portrait is held by the Australian War Memorial.

References

1898 births
1981 deaths
Australian Army officers
Australian military personnel of World War II
People educated at Newington College